William Holder FRS (1616 – 24 January 1698) was an English clergyman and music theorist of the 17th century. His most notable work was his widely known 1694 publication A Treatise on the Natural Grounds and Principles of Harmony.

Life

He studied at Pembroke Hall, Cambridge, where he became a fellow in 1640. He married Susanna Wren, sister of Christopher Wren, in 1643.  In 1662 he received a D.D. Oxon., and was a fellow of the Royal Society in 1663. He became a Canon of St. Paul's in 1672, and served as sub-dean of the Chapel Royal from 1674 until 1689 when he resigned. In 1687 he had been preferred to the rectory of Therfield. A few of his musical compositions survive in the British Library in the Harleian MSS 7338 and 7339.

In 1660 at Bletchingdon he taught a deaf mute, Alexander Popham to speak "plainly and distinctly, and with a good and graceful tone". The division of credit for this between Holder and John Wallis became a matter of dispute in the Royal Society.

See also 

 Holdrian comma

References 
Notes

Sources
 Holder, William, A Treatise on the Natural Grounds, and Principles of Harmony, facsimile of the 1694 edition, Broude Brothers, New York, 1967.
 Stanley, Jerome, "William Holder And His Position in Seventeenth-Century Philosophy and Music Theory,  #Edwin Mellen Press, Lewiston, N.Y., 2002.

1616 births
1698 deaths
Fellows of Pembroke College, Cambridge
Original Fellows of the Royal Society
English music theorists